Glauco Mauri (born 1 October 1930 in Pesaro) is an Italian actor and theatre director. He has appeared in more than twenty films since 1959.

Filmography

References

External links 

1930 births
Living people
Italian male film actors
Italian male stage actors
Italian theatre directors